Duval Creek (also known as Little Spring River) is a stream in southwest Missouri, Its source is in southwest Barton County, about  south-west of Lamar, and it flows south-south-west crossing under Missouri Route 126 and on entering Jasper County just to the east of Missouri Route Y. It continues on past the community of Cossville entering the North Fork of the Spring River just east of Missouri Route 43 in Jasper County,  north of Webb City.

The stream was named after a family of local settlers.

See also
List of rivers of Missouri

References

Rivers of Barton County, Missouri
Rivers of Jasper County, Missouri
Rivers of Missouri